Cepheus OB1 is an OB association around the cluster NGC 7380. The region is approximately 3,400 parsecs from Earth in the constellation of Cepheus.

Cepheus OB1 contains dozens of O and B class stars, but the brightest members are cool supergiants such as HR 8752 and RW Cephei.

References

External links
 Cepheus OB1

Stellar associations
Cepheus (constellation)
Star-forming regions